Can refer to:
Qiushi, a communist magazine,
Qiu Shi (screenwriter), a screenwriter who works with her director husband Huo Jianqi.